Le Maître-nageur is a 1979 French comedy-drama film directed by Jean-Louis Trintignant.

Cast 
 Guy Marchand : Marcel Potier
 Stefania Sandrelli : Marie Mariani Potier
 Jean-Claude Brialy : Logan
 Moustache : Achille Zopoulos
 Jean-Louis Trintignant : The gardener of Zopoulos
 Christian Marquand : Paul Jouriace
 François Perrot : Maître Dalloz
 Serge Marquand : Alfredo

References

External links

1979 films
1979 comedy-drama films
French comedy-drama films
1979 comedy films
1979 drama films
1970s French films